In enzymology, a 1-acylglycerol-3-phosphate O-acyltransferase is an enzyme that catalyzes the chemical reaction

acyl-CoA + 1-acyl-sn-glycerol 3-phosphate  CoA + 1,2-diacyl-sn-glycerol 3-phosphate

Thus, the two substrates of this enzyme are acyl-CoA and 1-acyl-sn-glycerol 3-phosphate, whereas its two products are CoA and 1,2-diacyl-sn-glycerol 3-phosphate.

This enzyme belongs to the family of transferases, specifically those acyltransferases transferring groups other than aminoacyl groups.  The systematic name of this enzyme class is acyl-CoA:1-acyl-sn-glycerol-3-phosphate 2-O-acyltransferase. Other names in common use include 1-acyl-sn-glycero-3-phosphate acyltransferase, 1-acyl-sn-glycerol 3-phosphate acyltransferase, 1-acylglycero-3-phosphate acyltransferase, 1-acylglycerolphosphate acyltransferase, 1-acylglycerophosphate acyltransferase, and lysophosphatidic acid-acyltransferase.  This enzyme participates in 3 metabolic pathways: glycerolipid metabolism, glycerophospholipid metabolism, and ether lipid metabolism.

References

 
 
 

EC 2.3.1
Enzymes of unknown structure